Melibiose is a reducing disaccharide formed by an α-1,6 linkage between galactose and glucose (D-Gal-α(1→6)-D-Glc). It differs from lactose in the chirality of the carbon where the galactose ring is closed and that the galactose is linked to a different point on the glucose moiety. It can be formed by invertase-mediated hydrolysis of raffinose, which produces melibiose and fructose.  Melibiose can be broken down into its component saccharides, glucose and galactose, by the enzyme alpha-galactosidase, such as MEL1 from Saccharomyces pastorianus (lager yeast).

Melibiose cannot be used by Saccharomyces cerevisiae (ale yeast), this is one test to differentiate between the two yeast species.

References

Disaccharides